Luz is the fourth album released by fado singer Cuca Roseta. It was released in November 2017 by Sony Music. At the time of its release, Rosetta said of its title: "I wanted to make a record with this word, which has to do with the fado and also with something more spiritual, more interior." It included songs written by Pedro da Silva Martins, Hélder Moutinho, and Jorge Fernando.

Track listing
 Luzinha	
 Quero	
 Foge	
 Triste Sina	
 Balelas	
 Sábio Mudo	
 Não Demores	
 Até Ao Amanhecer	
 Ai O Amor	
 Versos Contados	
 Luz Materna	
 Saudade E Eu	
 Rosinha Da Serra D'Arga	
 Contemplação	
 Alecrim	
 Luz Do Mundo

References

Cuca Roseta albums
2017 albums
Portuguese-language albums
Sony Music albums